Hubei Television, is a television network in Hubei province. Programming includes the shows Informal Talks (非正式会谈) and Unlocking the Secrets of Chinese Characters.

References

Television networks in China
Television channels and stations established in 2006